Wynnewood may mean:

 Wynnewood (Dallas, Texas)
 Wynnewood, Oklahoma
 Wynnewood, Pennsylvania
 Wynnewood (Tennessee), the largest existent log structure in Tennessee